John McQuade (born 8 July 1970) is a Scottish former footballer. A midfielder, he scored 69 goals in 335 league games in a 15-year professional career in the Scottish and English leagues.

He began his career with Dumbarton in 1987, helping the club to the Second Division title in 1991–92, before winning a £80,000 move to Hamilton Academical in 1993. He helped the "Accies" to win promotion out of the Second Division in 1996–97. In June 1998, he was signed by English club Port Vale, before he returned to Scotland in April 1999 to sign with Raith Rovers. He moved on to Ross County in July 2000, before switching to Peterhead for a one-month spell in January 2002.

Career
McQuade started his career with Dumbarton in 1987, just before the Boghead Park club suffered relegation out of the First Division in 1987–88 under the stewardship of Mark Clougherty and Bertie Auld. They fell down to 12th in 1988–89, with only Berwick Rangers and Stenhousemuir finishing lower in the Scottish Football League. The "Sons" rose to sixth in 1989–90 and seventh in 1990–91, before manager Billy Lamont led them to the Second Division title in 1991–92. They retained their second tier status with a ninth-place finish in 1992–93.

McQuade was bought by Hamilton Academical manager Iain Munro for a fee of £80,000 in 1993. His new side finished fourth in the First Division in 1993–94 and sixth in 1994–95, before dropping out of the division with a ninth-place finish in 1995–96. The Douglas Park outfit bounced straight back under new boss Sandy Clark, securing promotion out of the Second Division with the runners-up spot in 1996–97, a whole ten points clear of third placed Livingston. The "Accies" finished eighth in 1997–98, just two points ahead of relegated Partick Thistle; he made 30 appearances throughout the campaign.

He was signed by John Rudge at English First Division club Port Vale in June 1998. He made just three substitute appearances in the 1998–99 season, and departed Vale Park after new manager Brian Horton rejected the opportunity to extend his contract.

He joined Raith Rovers on a free transfer in April 1999, and made six appearances before the end of the season. After just a four-month stay at Stark's Park, he moved on to Stirling Albion. John Philliben's "Binos" finished seventh in the Second Division in 1999–2000; during the campaign McQuade scored a total of 16 goals in 41 games. He then left Forthbank Stadium and joined Ross County in July 2000. Neale Cooper's "Staggies" finished sixth in the First Division in 2000–01, as McQuade played 25 games. Having fallen out of the first team at Victoria Park, he moved on to Ian Wilson's Third Division side Peterhead in January 2002, before leaving Balmoor the following month.

Career statistics

Honours
Dumbarton
Scottish Football League Second Division: 1991–92

Hamilton Academical
Scottish Football League Second Division second-place promotion: 1996–97

References

Scottish footballers
Association football midfielders
Footballers from Glasgow
Dumbarton F.C. players
Hamilton Academical F.C. players
Port Vale F.C. players
Raith Rovers F.C. players
Stirling Albion F.C. players
Ross County F.C. players
Peterhead F.C. players
Scottish Football League players
English Football League players
1970 births
Living people